Aaron Alpeoria Bradley (–1881) was born into slavery, escaped, and became a lawyer in Massachusetts. After the American Civil War he moved to Georgia. He was denied admittance to the Georgia Bar, but became a political activist and worked as a lawyer from South Carolina during the Reconstruction Era. In 1865 he was arrested for his political activism.

He was elected as a representative to Georgia's Constitutional Convention of 1867. He was a critic of segregation, police brutality, and capitalism. He advocated for equal rights. He spoke out against  "bankers, millionaires, merchants, aristocratic mulattoes, [and] copperheaded Yankees".

Bradley never divulged his age but speculation suggests he was born around 1815. He was born on a large plantation in South Carolina and was of mixed ethnicity. He escaped to Boston in the 1830s, became one of the first black lawyers in the U.S., and was among the very few African Americans admitted to the bar before the Civil War. Others include Robert Morris (lawyer) in Massachusetts, 1847; George Boyer Vashon in New York, 1848; and John Mercer Langston in Ohio, 1854.
 
A skilled attorney, Bradley also operated a shoe store in Augusta, Georgia, for a short time.

Early career
In 1856 Bradley became the third African American admitted to the Massachusetts Bar.  He moved to Savannah, Georgia in 1865. In 1867 he applied for admission in United States District Court in Georgia. Northerners who moved south during the Reconstruction era were referred to pejoratively as carpetbaggers.

Due to the anti-black socio-political culture of the time, as well as Bradley's confrontational activism against racial injustice, he was denied admission. Judge John Ersking cited that the basis for Bradley's rejection was that he was not grounded in the “first principles” of law, and lacked “moral and mental qualifications.” Despite many efforts to gain admittance, Bradley was never allowed to legally practice law in this jurisdiction. But he was defiant, and practiced law in Georgia without a license until 1875.  He eventually moved to Beaufort, South Carolina, where he continued to practice law and serve his Georgia clients.

Controversy and radical advocacy
Soon after his arrival in Savannah, Georgia, in 1865, Bradley began to openly criticize the treatment of blacks during slavery, and demanded retroactive reparations to the year of enslavement.  He was a vocal critic of social injustices, including police brutality, as reflected in this quote from a speech he gave at New Street Baptist Church in Savannah: "The reign of police clubs and police authority would be abolished,” and a blow would be struck “which would stun even the policemen." He also organized protests about General William Tecumseh Sherman's Special Field Orders No. 15. This ultimately resulted in the government bringing criminal sedition charges against him.

Bradley fought against segregation with a petition in Federal Court requesting an injunction of operations against the Baltimore City Passenger Railway. The railway company had a policy of forcing blacks to stand on an uncovered platform outside of the covered portion of the railway car. After the original petitioners withdrew their complaints, Bradley filed an amended petition against the railway company alleging “that the street car company refused to let him ride in violation of his privileges and immunities under Article IV, took private property without compensation, and maintained a common nuisance in violation of privileges granted from the government for use of its highways without regard to color or race."

Social initiatives
Bradley was not afraid to challenge the status quo; "seeing himself as a champion of all blacks’ causes, he cast his interests broadly, establishing loose contacts with black churches and soon opening a school. He began agitating for black suffrage, joining forces with the vote campaign.... He accused the city police and the mayor's court of discrimination toward blacks [and] charged the Savannah Freedmen's Bureau Court with similar irregularities and requested inauguration of appeal procedures, offering his services as judge...."

His name is listed on the historical marker the "Original 33", a plaque listing the first 33 African-American members of the Georgia General Assembly who were elected to office in 1868.

See also
 Civil rights movement (1865–1896)

References

Further reading
 

1810s births
1881 deaths
African-American lawyers
South Carolina lawyers
African-American history of Massachusetts
19th-century American slaves
People from South Carolina
People from Savannah, Georgia
American civil rights activists
American civil rights lawyers
American political activists
Original 33
American reparationists
19th-century American lawyers
Lawyers from Boston
Georgia (U.S. state) lawyers
Georgia (U.S. state) state senators
African-American state legislators in Georgia (U.S. state)
19th-century American politicians
African-American politicians during the Reconstruction Era